Dolina is a rural locality (a village) in Ternovskoye Rural Settlement, Ternovsky District, Voronezh Oblast, Russia. The population was 126 as of 2010. There are 5 streets.

Geography
Dolina is located 9 km south of Ternovka (the district's administrative centre) by road. Ternovka is the nearest rural locality.

References 

Rural localities in Ternovsky District